Isaac Asimov's Magical Worlds of Fantasy is a series of twelve themed paperback fantasy and science fiction anthologies edited by  Isaac Asimov, Martin H. Greenberg and Charles G. Waugh, a companion set to the ten volume Isaac Asimov's Wonderful Worlds of Science Fiction, produced by the same editors. It was published by Signet/New American Library from 1983 to 1991. Volumes 1 and 2 were also issued in hardcover in an omnibus collection titled Isaac Asimov's Magical Worlds of Fantasy: Witches & Wizards.

Each volume in the series featured stories devoted to a different fantastic theme, as indicated in the individual volume titles. Most volumes also included an introduction by Asimov.

The series
 Wizards (1983)
 Witches (1984)
 Cosmic Knights (1985)
 Spells (1985)
 Giants (1985)
 Mythical Beasties (1986)
 Magical Wishes (1986)
 Devils (1987)
 Atlantis (1988)
 Ghosts (1988)
 Curses (1989)
 Faeries (1991)

References

See also
Isaac Asimov's Wonderful Worlds of Science Fiction

Fantasy anthologies
Science fiction anthologies
Isaac Asimov anthologies
Martin H. Greenberg anthologies